The 2 January 2017 Mogadishu bombings took place on 2 January 2017, when a pair of suicide car bombings targeted civilians and security forces in Somalia's capital. The first targeted a checkpoint, while a second car drove at high speed through it and detonated outside the Peace Hotel, opposite Aden Adde International Airport. The attack killed at least seven people and injured 17 others. The al-Shabaab militant group claimed responsibility for the attack.

References

2010s in Mogadishu
2017 in Somalia
2017 murders in Somalia
2017 road incidents
2 January 2017 bombings
2010s road incidents in Africa
21st-century mass murder in Somalia
2 January 2017 bombings
Attacks on buildings and structures in 2017
2 January 2017 bombings
2 January 2017 bombings
Attacks on hotels in Africa
Islamic terrorist incidents in 2017
January 2017 crimes in Africa
January 2017 events in Africa
Mass murder in 2017
2 January 2017 bombings
Road incidents in Somalia 
Suicide bombings in 2017 
2017 disasters in Somalia 

2 January 2017
Suicide car and truck bombings in Somalia
Terrorist incidents in Somalia in 2017
Somali Civil War (2009–present)
Hotel bombings